Barnes G-function, related to the Gamma function
Meijer G-function, a generalization of the hypergeometric function
Siegel G-function, a class of functions in transcendence theory